Joseph Jenkins (27 February 1818 – 26 September 1898), was an educated tenant farmer from Tregaron, Ceredigion, mid-Wales who, when aged over 50, suddenly deserted his home and large family to seek his fortune in Australia. The Australian Dictionary of Biography says that "Jenkins's noteworthiness stemmed from the rich documentation of his experiences and thoughts that has survived". He was a consistent diarist for 58 years of his life and a consistent if not outstanding poet, under the bardic name of Amnon II.
He achieved fame posthumously from publication of some excerpts of his Australian writings. 
The compiler, his grandson Dr William Evans, a Harley Street cardiologist, coined the title Diary of a Welsh Swagman by which name he is familiar to generations of Victoria school students for whom the book became a prescribed history text in 1978.

Early life and education

Joseph Jenkins was born at Blaenplwyf farm near Ystrad Aeron in Ceredigion, Wales. He was the fourth child of 12 brought up by Jenkin Jenkins and Eleanor (née Davies). In 1846 he married his second cousin Elisabeth (Betty) Evans of Tynant. They purchased the lease of Trecefel farm, Tregaron and had nine children, the last of whom, John David, was born in April 1868.

He commenced education under a disciplinarian private tutor and later attended a small Unitarian church school at Cribyn, a five-mile walk from home. Throughout his life, Joseph bewailed his lack of more formal education. However, his thirst for knowledge, religious temperament and passion for reading and writing proved a firm basis for continuing self-education.

Agricultural skills
Under his management, Trecefel won many prizes in agricultural shows and its cattle fetched top prices in the market. In 1851, it was judged to be the best farm in the county. In 1861, Joseph was appointed to adjudicate the same competition.
Joseph Jenkins favoured the rotation system of growing crops, spoke against deep ploughing, favoured thorough harrowing, and was a strong advocate of the virtue of feeding the soil with farmyard manure. In his writings appearing in farming journals, he emphasised the importance of harvesting young hay, and preparing lucerne and clover crops to provide fodder for cattle during a severe and prolonged frost in winter and periods of drought in summer. . .

Diaries

Joseph Jenkins consistently maintained a diary of daily events for 58 years. Though he was a native Welsh speaker, he penned the diaries in English as an aid to self-education. His biographer, Bethan Phillips, wrote in her foreword:
. . . The diaries reveal him as a man seeking to exorcise his own demons by attempting to escape from them, but they also reveal him as an astute observer of the people and occurrences impacting upon his own eventful life. His dogged determination in keeping a daily journal, often under the most difficult of circumstances and in the most unpropitious surroundings, has given us a uniquely valuable historical record of life in the nineteenth century.

Wales
The first entry was on New Year's Day, 1839. Though he continued to record each day, much of the early record has been lost. The earliest complete year extant is 1845. Manuscripts for the years 1839–1868 and 1895–1898 (when he lived in Wales) are held by the National Library of Wales at Aberystwyth, together with his shipboard diary of the voyage from Liverpool to Melbourne.

Australia

 
The Australian diaries which were acquired in 1997 by the State Library of Victoria, Melbourne, cover the years 1869–1894.

Joseph Jenkins disembarked from the iron-hulled schooner Eurynome at the Melbourne port of Hobson's Bay on 12 March 1869. The Eurynome was an 1163-ton sailing vessel transporting casks of beer to Australia on the clipper route, with 12 passengers in a first-class saloon and 21 (including Joseph) who paid a much lower price to share frugal and unhygienic steerage accommodation on the voyage of 140 days, including three terrifying weeks of gales in the Roaring Forties.

The following month's diary shows him carrying his swag, pessimistically prospecting and offering rural labour in and around the goldfields town of Castlemaine where he found many fellow Welshmen. He rarely left this vicinity except to attend the annual St David's Day eisteddfod at Ballarat where, on thirteen consecutive occasions, he was awarded the premier prize for an englyn (Welsh verse form).

Joseph obtained regular employment in 1884 as a cleaner of streets and drains in the town of Maldon, a few miles north from Castlemaine. He remained there working until he reached the age of 76 and became homesick for Wales. Having saved the fare, he departed Maldon by rail on 23 November 1894, and embarked on the ss Ophir which docked at Tilbury docks on 5 January 1895. In 1994 a water drinking fountain and a plaque were erected at Maldon railway station to recognise the centenary of Joseph Jenkins's departure and his unique record of the life of a rural worker in Victoria.  His own words were cited: Through this [diary] I am building. . . my own monument (pictured at right).

Return and controversy
On returning to Wales, he entrusted the diaries to his daughter Elinor (Nell) who stored them in the attic of her home, Tyndomen farm, near Tregaron. They came to light some 70 years later when a great-granddaughter, Frances Evans, recovered and protected them, permitting her uncle, Dr William Evans to read and edit the contents. Destruction of the diaries had been favoured by some family members who were concerned by their potential to arouse adverse reflection on reputations, especially that of Joseph's wife, Betty, whose alleged infidelity and at least one specific physical assault on him by her and others: [26 May 1868] . . . my ribs and breastbone were fractured . . . I have an ugly black eye with about a dozen other different wounds. were consistently blamed by him as the cause of his leaving home. However, no conclusive evidence has emerged that Betty was other than a loyal and capable wife—and one who may herself have had good reason to find fault with Joseph's own personality and behaviour. E.g., in Pity the Swagman, Bethan Phillips argues that Joseph drank excessively while at home, though he generally abstained in Australia, and that he became disliked by neighbours for actively supporting landowners and their politicians at a time when they were oppressing many tenant-farmers–who were consequently promoting liberal candidates.

Historical studies
In 1904 a body of information with a photograph of Joseph and a selection of his poetry in Welsh was included in the book Cerddi Cerngoch by Daniel Jenkins and David Lewis. (The title is Welsh for 'Poems of Redcheek'—the bardic name of Joseph's brother John—but the book also records writings of several other distinguished family members.) Most of the book is printed in the Welsh language but some prefatory pages are in English.

In 1998, Dr Bethan Phillips of Lampeter, having devoted many years to the project, including a visit to Australia, published her extensively researched account in Welsh: Rhwng Dau Fyd: Y Swagman O Geredigion, followed in 2002 by Pity the Swagman—The Australian Odyssey of a Victorian Diarist.

References and sources

Further reading
 Jones, Bill. Jenkins, Joseph (1818–1898) in online Australian Dictionary of Biography
 Hill, Gary. Once A Not So Jolly Swagman: The Story Of Joseph Jenkins at irefuteitthus.com, updated October 2018
 Diaries of Joseph Jenkins at the State Library of Victoria, with links to digitised pages of the diaries for online reading.
 The Welsh Swagman video, images and extracts at Culture Victoria
 Rees, Rev D. C. History of Tregaron Gomerian Press 1936
 Solomon, Rachel. "The Victorian Diaries of a Welsh Swagman (1869-1894)" in The Latrobe Journal No 92, December 2013, at State Library of Victoria, Melbourne. Also endnotes at p.11 (fol.190). Accessed 5 March 2016 
 Tregaron and District Historical Society. Tregaron–Images of a Country Town Landmark 2006
 Jeffreys E. Welsh Australians: their history and achievements Y Lolfa Cyf., Ceredigion 2008. 

1818 births
1898 deaths
Australian poets
Welsh emigrants to Australia
People from Ceredigion
People from Victoria (Australia)
Welsh poets
Welsh farmers
19th-century poets
19th-century Australian people
Australian diarists
19th-century diarists